Laughing Water Creek is a stream in the U.S. state of South Dakota.

Laughing Water Creek's name comes from the Sioux Indians of the area.

See also
List of rivers of South Dakota

References

Rivers of Custer County, South Dakota
Rivers of South Dakota